The Caritni, a Latinization, or the Karitnoi in the Greek of Ptolemy's Geography (2.10), were a Germanic tribe mentioned by the Roman scholar Ptolemy generally in the region of west Bavaria. Little else is known about them.

See also
List of Germanic peoples

Early Germanic peoples